Valley of Hunted Men is a 1942 American Western "Three Mesquiteers" B-movie directed by John English and starring Bob Steele, Tom Tyler, and Jimmie Dodd.

Cast 
 Bob Steele as Tucson Smith
 Tom Tyler as Stony Brooke
 Jimmie Dodd as Lullaby Joslin
 Edward Van Sloan as Dr. Heinrich Steiner
 Roland Varno as Captain Carl Baum / False Paul Schiller
 Anna Marie Stewart as Laura Steiner
 Edythe Elliott as Elisabeth Schiller
 Arno Frey as Counsel Von Breckner
 Richard K. French as Franz Toller (as Richard French)
 Robert R. Stephenson as Kruger (as Robert Stevenson)
 George N. Neise as Paul Schiller (as George Neise)

References

External links 

1942 films
1942 Western (genre) films
American Western (genre) films
American black-and-white films
Films directed by John English
Republic Pictures films
Three Mesquiteers films
1940s English-language films
1940s American films